The Wicklow county hurling team represents Wicklow in hurling and is governed by Wicklow GAA, the county board of the Gaelic Athletic Association. The team competes in the Christy Ring Cup and the National Hurling League.

Wicklow's home ground is Pearse Park, Arklow. The team's manager is Éamonn Scallan.

The team has never won the Leinster Senior Championship, the All-Ireland Senior Championship or the National League.

History
Wicklow won the All-Ireland Junior Hurling Championship in 1967 and 1971.

Wicklow won the Kehoe Cup on seven occasions: in 1989, 1991, 1998, 2000, 2001, 2002 and 2003.

Current panel

INJ Player has had an injury which has affected recent involvement with the county team.
RET Player has since retired from the county team.
WD Player has since withdrawn from the county team due to a non-injury issue.

Current management team
Manager: Éamonn Scallan
Coach: Eoin Larkin, since 2021

Managerial history
Efforts to find a manager to replace Michael Neary led the Wicklow County Board to advertise the position in the national media in early 2005.

Michael Neary Dublin 2000–2004

Willie Carley Wexford 2005–2006

Michael Nearyi Dublin 2006

Brendan Cuddihy 2006

John Mitchell 2006–2008

Michael Phelan 2009

Casey O'Brien 2009–2015

Martin Storey Wexford 2015–2016

Séamus Murphy Wexford 2016–2018

Éamonn Scallan Wexford 2018–2022

(i) = interim

Crest and colours
Wicklow's traditional team colours are royal blue and gold. The kits are usually blue shirts, white shorts and blue socks with a gold trim. Wicklow's alternative jersey is white with blue shorts and blue socks.

The Wicklow crest features the roundtower of Glendalough in the foreground surrounded by a large 'W' standing for the name of the county. In the background of the crest is a green mountain, representing the Wicklow Mountains and below is a hand holding a Gaelic football and a hurley and sliotar.

Kit evolution

Team sponsorship
Joule became Wicklow's shirt sponsor ahead of the 2017 season.

Honours

National
All-Ireland Senior B Hurling Championship
 Winners (1): 2003
 Runners-up (2): 1995, 2002
All-Ireland Intermediate Hurling Championship

 Runners-up (1): 1971
All-Ireland Junior Hurling Championship
 Winners (2): 1967, 1971

 
Christy Ring Cup
 Winners (2): 2011, 2012
 
 
National Hurling League Division 2B
 Winners (2): 2014, 2019
National Hurling League Division 3A
 Winners (1): 2011
National Hurling League Division 3B
 Winners (1): 2010
All-Ireland Under 21 B Hurling Championship
 Winners (1): 2015

Provincial
Kehoe Cup
 Winners (7): 1989, 1991, 1998, 2000, 2001, 2002, 2003
Kehoe Shield
 Winners (1): 2022
 Leinster Intermediate Hurling Championship
 Winners (1): 1971
Leinster Junior Hurling Championship
 Winners (5): 1954, 1964, 1965, 1967, 1971

References

 
County hurling teams